Abema (stylized as ABEMA) is a Japanese live TV streaming website owned by the entertainment company, AbemaTV, Inc. that provides over-the-top media services to customers in Japan. The website primarily acts as an online television network, with multiple channels including news, sports, entertainment, anime and more. Users can watch most channels for free with the option to become a premium member, allowing them to view past programs on demand. Abema is owned by AbemaTV, Inc., which itself is 55.2% owned by CyberAgent and 36.8% owned by TV Asahi, with the remaining ownership by various other companies, most of them in the media and entertainment industry. In 2022, Abema broadcast all 64 matches of 2022 FIFA World Cup.

List of channels

Other channels
These channels run on an inconsistent schedule
 Sports Live – Live sports competitions such as the premier league
 Shogi Live – Live shogi competitions
 Mahjong Live – Live Mahjong competitions
 UFC – Live UFC matches and content
  – Live honbasho sumo matches and content
 Ultra Games – Live eSports competitions and video game related programs and content

See also 
 Ameba (website)
 Internet TV

References

External links 
  – AbemaTV Official Site
  – AbemaTV, Inc. Company Official site
  – coderzhub Official Site

2015 establishments in Japan
2016 software
Ameba (website)
Android (operating system) software
CyberAgent
Internet properties established in 2016
Internet technology companies of Japan
iOS software
Japanese companies established in 2015
Japanese entertainment websites
Mass media companies based in Tokyo
Mass media companies established in 2015
Online companies of Japan
TV Asahi